Houghton is a small village and civil parish in the Test Valley district of Hampshire, England. The village is situated alongside the River Test. Its nearest town is Stockbridge, which lies approximately 1.8 miles (3 km) to the north-east. The village is a dispersed linear settlement, mostly strung out along the single road through the village, which broadly follows the course of the River Test north-south. Houghton is dominated by substantial agricultural/sporting estates at each end, the Houghton Lodge estate  to the north and the Bossington estate  to the south. Each owns a number of properties in the village.

Manors and houses
Houghton Lodge  itself is an example of the rare 'Cottage ornée' style, of the late eighteenth century. The village also has an ancient church, All Saints, where services run on a weekly basis (with more at the tiny St James's church Bossington, set in open fields just to the south of the village.)  In the Summer of 1415, during the Hundred Years' War, the army of Henry V of England camped on Agincourt Field on the Bossington estate on its way to embark for northern France and the campaign which ended with the Battle of Agincourt.

John of Gaunt, 1st Duke of Lancaster, a son of Edward III from whom the Plantagenet House of Lancaster was descended, had a palace or hunting lodge in the neighbouring village of King's Somborne and a medieval deer park in the valley here in the fourteenth century.  Some of the remains of the deer park's boundary embankments (or pale) can still be seen near Black Lake Farm as you cross the valley on foot on the Clarendon Way.

Architecture
The architecture of the village is mainly Hampshire rural vernacular, with some timber-frame and thatch, as well as much brick and slate. There are nearly 50 listed buildings in the village, which include North Houghton Manor, Houghton Lodge, Houghton Manor House, All Saints Church, The Old Rectory, Bossington Mill, and Bossington House, as well as many smaller houses, the oldest of which dates back to the fifteenth century.  Nearly a fifth of the houses in the village are listed, and most of the village falls within a Conservation Area, designated in 1990.

Amenities
A number of public footpaths intersect in Houghton, including the Test Way and the Clarendon Way, which crosses the River Test at the lovely spreading footbridge known locally as 'Sheep Bridge', a beautiful spot much frequented by swans and ducks and visited by the occasional egret. However, there is no public right of access to the river bank or the river itself. The spring-fed River Test is clear and teems with trout and grayling.  Most of the fishing in and around the village is owned by the Houghton Lodge estate, the Bossington estate, or the exclusive Houghton Club, founded in 1822 and the oldest fishing club in England.

The village has a pub, The Boot Inn, with a garden running down to the banks of the River Test.  There is no village shop or school.

Houghton has a village hall, used for functions such as the annual village Harvest Supper. There is a small recreation ground next to the hall.

References

External links

Villages in Hampshire
Test Valley